Molangul is a rural locality in the Bundaberg Region, Queensland, Australia.

Geography 
The Kalpowar Road passes through the locality from Gaeta to the south-east through to Kalpowar to the west.

History 
In 1887,  of land were resumed from the Molungal pastoral run. The land was offered for selection for the establishment of small farms on 17 April 1887.

Education 
There are no schools in Molangul. The nearest primary schools are in Builyan and Mount Perry. The nearest secondary school is in Monto.

References 

Bundaberg Region
Localities in Queensland